Qaleh Lan (also Romanized as Qal‘eh Lān) is a village in Poshtdarband Rural District, in the Central District of Kermanshah County, Kermanshah Province, Iran. At the 2006 census, its population was 225, in 50 families.

References 

Populated places in Kermanshah County